Kosinsky (masculine), Kosinskaya (feminine), or Kosinskoye (neuter) is the name of several rural localities in Russia:
Kosinskoye, Kostroma Oblast, a village in Buysky District of Kostroma Oblast
Kosinskoye, Vladimir Oblast, a selo in Yuryev-Polsky District of Vladimir Oblast